Sir Anand Swarup (6 August 1881 – 24 June 1937), also known as Param Guru Huzur Sahabji Maharaj, was the founder of Dayalbagh. He was the fifth revered leader, or Sant Satguru, of the Dayalbagh branch of the Radha Soami sect, who succeeded Sarkar Sahab in 1913. He also laid the foundation of Radha Soami Educational Institute, a co-educational middle school which opened in 1917 and later expanded and developed as Dayalbagh Educational Institute (Deemed University). He wrote many holy books on the Radha Soami sect, explaining the concepts of Surat Shabd Yoga and objectives of Radha Soami in general.

He was knighted in the 1936 New Year Honours. for founding Dayalbagh.

See also
Contemporary Sant Mat movements
Sant Mat

References

External links
Radhasoami Satsang
Radhasoami Dayal
Sant Mat - Radhasoami Mat
Official site

Sources
 Radha Soami Sect – History and Tenets. Radha Soami Satsang (Publisher), 2nd ed, Agra, 1988

Indian Knights Bachelor
Radha Soami
1881 births
1937 deaths